Homilae or Homilai was a town in Oetaea in ancient Thessaly. The town's name appears in an epigraph dated to 206/5 BCE as providing a hieromnemone to the Amphictyonic League on behalf of the Aetolians.

Its site is at the modern site of Kouvelo Kastro/Kastro Orias.

References

Populated places in ancient Thessaly
Former populated places in Greece
Oetaea